Teniente Julio Gallardo Airport,  is an airport serving Puerto Natales, a city in the Magallanes Region of Chile.

Expansion
Work is expected to be completed in September 2016 and is being done so that the airport is better able to handle aircraft such as the A320 and Boeing 737 to return scheduled commercial service to Puerto Natales, which it has not had since 2013.

Airlines and destinations

See also
Transport in Chile
List of airports in Chile

References

External links
Teniente Julio Gallardo Airport at OpenStreetMap

Airports in Chile
Airports in Magallanes Region
Última Esperanza Province